Megan-Jane Johnstone (AO) is a nursing scholar and contemporary artist.

She is the author of Bioethics: a nursing perspective, first published in 1989 and released as an 8th revised edition in 2023, and invited curating editor of Nursing Ethics,  a three volume Sage major reference publication. Other books by Johnstone include: Nursing and the injustices of the law; Ethics in nursing practice: a guide to ethical decision making (Co-Authored with Sara T Fry); Alzheimers disease, media representations and the politics of euthanaisa: constructing risk and selling death in an ageing society; and Effective writing for health professionals: a practical gudie to getting published. In 2019, Johnstone was awarded Officer of the Order of Australia "(for) distinguished service to medical education in the field of nursing and health care ethics, to patients' rights, and to professional standards."

Education 
From 1974 to 1977, Johnstone trained as a nurse at Waikato Hospital, and went on to study Philosophy and Literature at University of Waikato from 1980 to 1984. There she received the Prior Society Prize in Philosophy, awarded to third year students demonstrating outstanding ability in the subject of philosophy. In 1990, she was received the Annie M. Sage Nursing Memorial Scholarship, Royal College of Nursing, Australia (now known as Australian College of Nursing). From 1990 to 1992 Johnstone was at La Trobe University where she gained a Doctorate in Philosophy (Legal Studies).

Career 
Johnstone began her academic career in 1987 as a lecturer in nursing at the former Phillip Institute of Technology, now RMIT University.  From 1998-2008 served she served as Professor in the Department of Nursing and Midwifery at RMIT University,  until moving to Deakin University, where she held positions in the School of Nursing and Midwifery until 2017. At retirement, Professor Johnstone was Academic Chair/Professor of Nursing at the School of Nursing and Midwifery.

Since retirement, she now practices as a contemporary artist.

Awards 
1998: Recipient of the Inaugural Mona Menzies Post Doctoral Research Award, Nurses Board of Victoria, to conduct post doctoral research into ethical issues associated with the mandatory reporting of child abuse.

2010: Australian College of Nursing (formerly Royal College of Nursing, Australia) Merit Award for Publication.

Honours 

2019: Officer of the Order of Australia "for distinguished service to medical education in the field of nursing and health care ethics, to patients' rights, and to professional standards".

References 

Australian women academics
Officers of the Order of Australia
Living people
La Trobe University alumni
Academic staff of Deakin University
University of Waikato alumni
Academic staff of RMIT University
Year of birth missing (living people)